The Sumerian word NIN (from the Akkadian pronunciation of the sign EREŠ)(𒎏) was used to denote a queen or a priestess, and is often translated as "lady". Other translations include "queen", "mistress", "proprietress", and "lord".

Many goddesses are called NIN, such as DNIN.GAL ("great lady"), DÉ.NIN.GAL ("lady of the great temple"), DEREŠ.KI.GAL, and DNIN.TI.

The compound form NIN.DINGIR ("divine lady" or "lady of [a] god"), from the Akkadian entu,  denotes a priestess.

In writing

NIN originated as a ligature of the cuneiform glyphs of MUNUS and TÚG; the NIN sign was written as MUNUS.TÚG in archaic cuneiform, notably in the Codex Hammurabi. The syllable nin, on the other hand, was written as MUNUS.KA in Assyrian cuneiform. MUNUS.KU = NIN9 means "sister".

Occurrence in the Gilgamesh epic

Ninsun (DNIN.SÚN) as the mother of Gilgamesh in the Epic of Gilgamesh (standard Babylonian version), appears in 5 of the 12 chapters (tablets I, II, III, IV, and XII). The other personage using NIN is the god Ninurta (DNIN.URTA), who appears in Tablet I, and especially in the flood myth of Tablet XI.

Of the 51 uses of NIN, the other major usage is for the Akkadian word eninna (nin as in e-nin-na, but also other variants). Eninna is the adverb "now", but it can also be used as a conjunction, or as a segue-form (a transition form).

The two uses of NIN as the word for "sister" (Akkadian ahātu), for example, are used in Tablet 8 (The Mourning of Enkidu), line 38:
"May…
"May the brothers go into mourning over you like sisters…"

See also

Bel (mythology)
EN (cuneiform)
Nin-anna
Nin-hursag
Nin-imma
Nin-isina
Nin-ildu
Puabi-Nin

References

  (Volume 1) in the original Akkadian cuneiform and transliteration; commentary and glossary are in English

Cuneiform determinatives
Mesopotamian goddesses
Sumerian titles
Sumerograms
Women's social titles